The following lists events that happened during 1882 in Chile.

Incumbents
President of Chile: Domingo Santa María

Events 
About 6,000 European immigrants are registered in the country, as a result of foreign colonization policies.

The Chilean State breaks relations with the Holy See.

February
5 February - Battle of Pucará

July
9 July - Battle of La Concepción

Births
18 September - Vernon Steele (d. 1955)
20 September - Luis Pardo (d. 1935)

Deaths
20 February - Manuel Camilo Vial (b. 1804)
9 July - Ignacio Carrera Pinto (b. 1848)

References 

 
Years of the 19th century in Chile